Linkage (born in 1979 in Kentucky) was an American Thoroughbred racehorse he was the son of Hoist the Flag and grandson to Tom Rolfe. Linkage will be best remembered for winning the 1982 Blue Grass Stakes and placing second five weeks later in the $200,000 grade 1 Preakness Stakes to Aloma's Ruler.

Early racing career 

At age two Linkage won his maiden in his second career start at Aqueduct Racetrack. Several months later won two different allowance races at Aqueduct and Laurel Park Racecourse. He then went on to win in the Forerunner Stakes at a mile and one eighth in August at Keeneland Race Course in Lexington, Kentucky.

At age three he was shipped with the rest of trainer Henry S. Clark's stable of horses to New Orleans, Louisiana for the winter.  He flourished early in the winter at Fair Grounds and won or placed in every race in which he was entered. All were run against his fellow three-year-old colts.  In early January he raced in and won the $60,000 Black Gold Handicap at six furlongs over Talent Town also at Fairgrounds. In late January he won the grade three $80,000 Lecomte Stakes at Fair Grounds Race Course over Soy Emperor at a mile and one sixteenth.  In late February he won the $100,000 grade two Louisiana Derby Trial Stakes now called the Risen Star Stakes at a mile and one sixteenth.  He did this in impressive fashion beating the previously undefeated El Baba who was 7-0 coming into the race.

Clark decided to run in two last big prep races to get Linkage ready for a triple crown campaign.  In march he was entered in the $150,000 grade two Louisiana Derby.  In that race he was beaten by his arch-rival El Baba who turned the tables on him and beat him by a length.  Linkage was then shipped to Kentucky and was entered in the $150,000 grade one Blue Grass Stakes at Keeneland Race Course at a mile and one eighth.  In the Blue Grass he beat eventual Kentucky Derby winner Gato Del Sol by two lengths.  The race seemed to take a bit out of Linkage and with only three weeks until the Derby, Clark decided to skip that race and focus entirely on the Preakness Stakes.

Preakness Stakes

Five weeks after his Blue Grass victory, his trainer Henry S. Clark entered Linkage in the $200,000 Preakness Stakes was run at a mile and three sixteenths on dirt at Pimlico Race Course in Baltimore, Maryland.  Linkage was listed as the heavy 1-2 favorite in a field of seven stakes- winning colts. He Linkage broke well in second place under Bill Shoemaker but was aggressively rated back to third going into Pimlico's famous "Clubhouse Turn." Linkage was taken to the outside  and moved into third going down the backstretch. Fractions were swift on the front end, with the first quarter in :234/5 and the half in :48 flat.

Linkage was on the outside but was hemming in the others around him snugly. He was always within striking distance of the front runner Aloma's Ruler. At three quarters of a mile, he was one length back and at the mile  He was one and half back as the leader tipped the clock at 1:362/5 for eight furlongs. At the top of the stretch, Shoemaker asked Linkage for his run, and he responded willingly. He closed steadily but could not quite catch Aloma's Ruler, who held on to win by a neck. Linkage came in second by seven lengths over 41-1 longshot Cut Away.  Linkage took home 20% of the purse, or  $40,000.

Late career

At age four Linkage seemed to slow down a bit.  He only managed to place third in the grade one Monmouth Handicap (now renamed the Philip H. Iselin Stakes) at Monmouth Park Racetrack in Oceanport, New Jersey.

Linkage died of natural causes in early September 2006, at Horizon Farm, Alberta, Canada.

Breeding

References

 Play On's Forge's pedigree and partial racing stats

1979 racehorse births
Racehorses bred in Kentucky
Racehorses trained in the United States
Thoroughbred family 1-a